Saldanha may refer to:

Places

South Africa
 Saldanha Bay, a bay in Western Cape
 Saldanha, Western Cape, a town on the bay
 Saldanha Bay Local Municipality, the unit of government that administers the Saldanha Bay region

Other countries
 Saldanha (Lisbon Metro), a railway station in Lisbon, Portugal
 Saldanha, a civil parish in Mogadouro, Portugal
 Saldaña de Burgos, Castile and León, Spain

People
 Saldanha (footballer, born 1989), Brazilian football right-back
 Saldanha (footballer, born 1999), Brazilian football forward
 Saldanha da Gama (1846–1895), Brazilian admiral
 António de Saldanha (fl. 16th century), Castilian-Portuguese explorer for whom the South African bay is named
 Carlos Saldanha (born 1965), Brazilian film director
 Jacintha Saldanha (1966–2012), Indian nurse in London who committed suicide after a prank call
 João Carlos Saldanha de Oliveira Daun, 1st Duke of Saldanha (1790–1876), Portuguese marshal and statesman
 João Saldanha (1917–1990), Brazilian journalist and football manager
 José Pintos Saldanha (born 1964), Uruguayan footballer
 Josh Saldanha, former drummer for the German metal band Disillusion
 Lawrence Saldanha (born 1936), Indian Catholic priest, 10th Archbishop of Lahore
 V. J. P. Saldanha (1925–2000), Indian Konkani-language writer

Military history
 Battle of Saldanha Bay (1781), a naval action of the Fourth Anglo-Dutch War
 Capitulation of Saldanha Bay, the 1796 surrender of a Dutch expeditionary force to the British Royal Navy
 HMS Saldanha, two vessels of the Royal Navy

Science
 Saldanha (plant genus), a former genus in the plant family Rubiaceae
 Saldanha catshark, Apristurus saldanha
 1456 Saldanha, an asteroid

Other uses
 Saldanha Steel, a South African steel company
 Beals v. Saldanha, a Supreme Court of Canada decision
 Duke of Saldanha, a Portuguese title

See also 
 Saldaña (disambiguation), the Spanish form of this name

Portuguese-language surnames